Nigel J. Cutland is Professor of Mathematics at the University of York. His main fields of interest are non-standard analysis, Loeb spaces, and applications in probability and stochastic analysis. He was Editor-in-Chief of Logic and Analysis and Journal of Logic and Analysis.

Books

See also
Influence of non-standard analysis

References

20th-century British mathematicians
21st-century British mathematicians
Living people
Year of birth missing (living people)